The Interstate Cadet was an American two-seat tandem, high wing, single-engine monoplane light aircraft. Around 320 of these aircraft were produced between the years 1941 and 1942 by the Interstate Aircraft and Engineering Corporation based in El Segundo, California. The construction techniques employed were a welded steel tube fuselage, wood (spruce) wing structure with metal ribs, and fabric covering, all of which were fairly standard in the 1940s.

An Interstate Cadet, flown by aviator Cornelia Fort and an unknown student, was one of the first aircraft (if not the first) to be attacked by IJNAS Japanese naval planes en route to the Pearl Harbor attack on December 7, 1941.

Design and development
The original version, the S1 prototype, was powered by the 50 hp Continental A50 engine, but was soon upgraded to the Continental A65 engine and redesignated as the S1-A-65F. This was a common engine used in many small American two-seat aircraft of the time. This aircraft would be used during World War II under the L-6A designation.

In 1945 the rights to the aircraft were sold to Harlow Aircraft Company, which in turn resold the tooling and parts to the Call Aircraft Company of Afton, Wyoming in 1946 for $5,000 ($ in ). Callair rebuilt a number of S-1, S-1A and L-6s, some with engine upgrades, for local ranchers and bush pilots as well as two examples of their own serial numbered CallAir S-1A-90C before stopping production, focusing instead on variations of its original CallAir Model A (which also sold in small numbers, fewer than 200 total units).

One reason the Cadet may not have sold well was that this aircraft cost almost three times the amount of the comparable Piper J-3 Cub. However, a close look at the two aircraft reveals that the Cadet was faster, stronger, and could be operated in a more rugged environment with its Oleo strut/Compression spring suspension system. Popular upgrades for this airframe included larger engines(75/85/90/100 hp), better brakes, and a different tailwheel system.

In the late 1960s the type certificates and tooling were bought by the newly formed Arctic Aircraft Company who transformed the S-1B1 into a bush plane by upgrading structural elements of the fuselage, landing gear and wings. This aircraft was designated the S-1B2, was used a Lycoming O-320 160 HP engine and a McCauley propeller for increased performance and was certified in 1975 as the Arctic Tern. The new Type certification also covered installing the same engine in otherwise standard Interstate Cadets.

Variants

S-1
Certified in 1940 and powered by a Continental A50-8 engine.
S-1A
Certified in 1941 and powered by a Continental A65-8 engine.

S-1A-65F
1941 variant powered by a 65hp Franklin 4AC-176-B2 engine.
S-1A-85F
1942 variant powered by an 85hp Franklin 4AC-199-D2 engine.
S-1A-90C
1952 Callair variant powered by a 90hp Continental C90-8 engine.only two built.
S-1A-90F
1942 variant powered by 90hp Franklin 4AC-199-E2 engine.
S-1B1
1942 variant with a Franklin 4ACG-199-H3 engine. Military production as the L-6 Grasshopper.
S-1B2 (Arctic Tern)
1975 improved variant of the S-1B1 powered by a Lycoming O-320-A2B or B2B engine.
XO-63 Grasshopper
United States Army designation for one S-1B for evaluation, later designated the XL-6.
L-6A Grasshopper
United States Army designation for the S-1B1, 250 built.
L-8A Cadet
United States Army designation for eight S-1As ordered on behalf of the Bolivian Air Force.

Specifications (S-1B1)

See also

References
Notes

Bibliography

 

Interstate aircraft
1940s United States civil utility aircraft
High-wing aircraft
Single-engined tractor aircraft
Aircraft first flown in 1940